The Viking SF-2A Cygnet, also called the Sisler SF-2A Cygnet and the HAPI SF-2A Cygnet, is an American STOL amateur-built aircraft, designed by Bert Sisler and produced by Viking Aircraft LLC. The aircraft is supplied in the form of plans for amateur construction. The Cygnet first flew in 1973.

The Cygnet plans were originally marketed by the designer through his company Sisler Aircraft of Bloomington, Minnesota and later by HAPI Engines, a supplier of Volkswagen air-cooled engines. By the 1990s Viking Aircraft of Elkhorn, Wisconsin took over supplying the aircraft plans.

Design and development
The SF-2A Cygnet is a development of the earlier Sisler SF-2 Whistler introduced in 1973. The design features a strut-braced shoulder-wing, a two-seats-in-side-by-side configuration enclosed cockpit under a bubble canopy, fixed conventional landing gear and a single engine in tractor configuration.

The aircraft is made from wood, 4130 steel tubing and covered in doped aircraft fabric. Construction time from the supplied kit is estimated as 1700–1800 hours.

The Cygnet won a design award at the EAA Annual Convention and Fly-In in 1973.

Operational history

By January 2003, 100 examples had been reported as completed and flown.

In July 2016 a total of 19 SF-2A Cygnets were registered in the United States with the Federal Aviation Administration, four with Transport Canada and seven with the Civil Aviation Authority in the United Kingdom.

In a 2020 review, AVweb writer Paul Dye concluded, "Flying a piece of history (and with a forward swept wing, something fairly unique!) is always fun. Just like all strange meat gets described as "tasting like chicken", it is easy to describe airplanes like this as flying "like a Cub"—and it’s true, in the sense that it is well-mannered and easy to steer around the sky. Yes, that visibility at the start of a turn is going to take a little getting used to, as is the landing attitude. But if you take the time to get it figured out, the Cygnet is a nice little airplane with a Midwest tradition. Honest, straightforward, and enjoyable.".

Specifications (SF-2A Cygnet)

References

External links

Homebuilt aircraft
Single-engined tractor aircraft